Acropsis is a genus of phaneropterid bushcrickets belonging to the family Tettigoniidae.

The species of this genus are found in Southern America.

Species:

Acropsis julianae 
Acropsis solimoesensis 
Acropsis tectiformis

References

Tettigoniidae